Sharecropping is  a legal arrangement with regard to agricultural land in which a landowner allows a tenant to use the land in return for a share of the crops produced on that land.

Sharecropping has a long history and there are a wide range of different situations and types of agreements that have used a form of the system. Some are governed by tradition, and others by law. The Italian mezzadria, the French métayage, the Catalan masoveria, the Castilian mediero, the Slavic połownictwo and izdolshchina, and the Islamic system of muzara‘a (المزارعة), are examples of legal systems that have supported sharecropping.

Overview

Sharecropping has benefits and costs for both the owners and the tenant. Under a sharecropping system, the landowner provided a share of land to be worked by the sharecropper, and usually provided other necessities such as housing, tools, seed, or working animals. Local merchants usually provided food and other supplies to the sharecropper on credit. In exchange for the land and supplies, the cropper would pay the owner a share of the crop at the end of the season, typically one-half to two-thirds. The cropper used his share to pay off his debt to the merchant. If there was any cash left over, the cropper kept it—but if his share came to less than what he owed, he remained in debt.

Farmers who farmed land belonging to others but owned their own mule and plow were called tenant farmers; they owed the landowner a smaller share of their crops, as the landowner did not have to provide them with as much in the way of supplies.

In this system, the landowner encourages the cropper to remain on the land, solving the harvest rush problem. Since the cropper pays in shares or portions of his harvest, owners and croppers both share the risks and benefits of harvests being large or small and of prices being high or low. Because both parties benefit from larger harvests, tenants have an incentive to work harder and invest in better methods than, for example, in a slave plantation system. However, by dividing the working force into many individual workers, large farms do not benefit from economies of scale. Though the arrangement protected sharecroppers from the negative effects of a bad crop, many sharecroppers (both white and black) remained quite poor.

Advantages 

Sociologist Jeffery M. Paige made a distinction between centralized sharecropping found on cotton plantations and the decentralized sharecropping with other crops. The former is characterized by long lasting tenure. Tenants are tied to the landlord through the plantation store. This form of tenure tends to be replaced by paid salaries as markets penetrate. Decentralized sharecropping involves virtually no role for the landlord: plots are scattered, peasants manage their own labor and the landowners do not manufacture the crops. This form of tenure becomes more common when markets penetrate.

Some economists have argued that sharecropping is not as exploitative as it is often perceived. John Heath and Hans P. Binswanger, contend that "evidence from around the world suggests that sharecropping is often a way for differently endowed enterprises to pool resources to mutual benefit, overcoming credit restraints and helping to manage risk."

Sharecropping agreements can be made fairly, as a form of tenant farming or sharefarming that has a variable rental payment, paid in arrears. There are three different types of contracts.
Workers can rent plots of land from the owner for a certain sum and keep the whole crop.
Workers work on the land and earn a fixed wage from the land owner but keep some of the crop.
No money changes hands but the worker and land owner each keep a share of the crop.

It also gave sharecroppers a vested interest in the land, incentivizing hard work and care. American plantations were, however, wary of this interest, as they felt that would lead to African Americans demanding rights of partnership. Many black laborers denied the unilateral authority that landowners hoped to achieve, further complicating relations between landowners and sharecroppers.

Landlords opt for sharecropping to avoid the administrative costs and shirking that occurs on plantations and haciendas. It is preferred to cash tenancy because cash tenants take all the risks, and any harvest failure will hurt them and not the landlord. Therefore, they tend to demand lower rents than sharecroppers.

Another possible benefit to sharecropping is that it enables women to have access to arable land, albeit not as owners, in places where ownership rights are vested only in men.

Disadvantages
The practice was harmful to tenants with many cases of high interest rates, unpredictable harvests, and unscrupulous landlords and merchants often keeping tenant farm families severely indebted. The debt was often compounded year on year leaving the cropper vulnerable to intimidation and shortchanging. Nevertheless, it appeared to be inevitable, with no serious alternative unless the croppers  left agriculture.

A new system of credit, the crop lien, became closely associated with sharecropping. Under this system, a planter or merchant extended a line of credit to the sharecropper while taking the year's crop as collateral. The sharecropper could then draw food and supplies all year long. When the crop was harvested, the planter or merchants who held the lien sold the harvest for the sharecropper and settled the debt.

Sharecropping has more than a passing similarity to serfdom or indenture, particularly where associated with large debts at a plantation store that effectively ties down the workers and their family to the land. It has therefore been seen as an issue of land reform in contexts such as the Mexican Revolution.

Regions
Historically, sharecropping occurred extensively in Scotland, Ireland and colonial Africa. Use of the sharecropper system has also been identified in England (as the practice of "farming to halves"). It was widely used in the Southern United States during the Reconstruction era (1865–1877) that followed the American Civil War, which was economically devastating to the southern states. It is still used in many rural poor areas of the world today, notably in Pakistan, India, and Bangladesh.

Africa 
In settler colonies of colonial Africa, sharecropping was a feature of the agricultural life. White farmers, who owned most of the land, were frequently unable to work the whole of their farm for lack of capital. They, therefore, had African farmers to work the excess on a sharecropping basis. In South Africa the 1913 Natives' Land Act outlawed the ownership of land by Africans in areas designated for white ownership and effectively reduced the status of most sharecroppers to tenant farmers and then to farm laborers. In the 1960s, generous subsidies to white farmers meant that most farmers could afford to work their entire farms, and sharecropping faded out.

The arrangement has reappeared in other African countries in modern times, including Ghana and Zimbabwe.

Economic historian Pius S. Nyambara argued that Eurocentric historiographical devices such as 'feudalism' or 'slavery' often qualified by weak prefixes like 'semi-' or 'quasi-' are not helpful in understanding the antecedents and functions of sharecropping in Africa.

United States

Prior to the Civil War, sharecropping is known to have existed in Mississippi and is believed to have been in place in Tennessee. However, it was not until the economic upheaval caused by the American Civil War and the end of slavery during and after Reconstruction that it became widespread in the South. It is theorized that sharecropping in the United States originated in the Natchez District, roughly centered in Adams County, Mississippi with its county seat, Natchez.

After the war, plantations and other lands throughout the South were seized by the federal government. In January 1865, General William T. Sherman issued Special Field Orders No. 15, which announced that he would temporarily grant newly freed families 40 acres of this seized land on the islands and coastal regions of Georgia. Many believed that this policy would be extended to all former slaves and their families as repayment for their treatment at the end of the war. In the summer of 1865, President Andrew Johnson, as one of the first acts of Reconstruction, instead ordered all land under federal control be returned to the owners from whom it had been seized.

Southern landowners thus found themselves with a great deal of land, but no liquid assets to pay for labor. Many former slaves, now called freedmen, having no land or other assets of their own, needed to work to support their families. A sharecropping system centered on cotton, a major cash crop, developed as a result. Large plantations were subdivided into plots that could be worked by sharecroppers. Initially, sharecroppers in the American South were almost all black former slaves, but eventually cash-strapped indigent white farmers were integrated into the system. During Reconstruction, the federal Freedmen's Bureau ordered the arrangements for freedmen and wrote and enforced their contracts.

American sharecroppers worked a section of the plantation independently, usually growing cotton, tobacco, rice, sugar, and other cash crops, and received half of the parcel's output. Sharecroppers also often received their farming tools and all other goods from the landowner they were contracted with. Landowners dictated decisions relating to the crop mix, and sharecroppers were often in agreements to sell their portion of the crop back to the landowner, thus being subjected to manipulated prices. In addition to this, landowners, threatening to not renew the lease at the end of the growing season, were able to apply pressure to their tenants. Sharecropping often proved economically problematic, as the landowners held significant economic control.

In the Reconstruction Era, sharecropping was one of few options for penniless freedmen to support themselves and their families. Other solutions included the crop-lien system (where the farmer was extended credit for seed and other supplies by the merchant), a rent labor system (where the former slave rents his land but keeps his entire crop), and the wage system (worker earns a fixed wage, but keeps none of their crop). Sharecropping was by far the most economically efficient, as it provided incentives for workers to produce a bigger harvest. It was a stage beyond simple hired labor because the sharecropper had an annual contract. Sharecropping as historically practiced in the American South is considered more economically productive than the gang system of slave plantations, though less efficient than modern agricultural techniques.

Sharecropping continued to be a significant institution in many states for decades following the Civil War. By the early 1930s, there were 5.5 million white tenant farmers, sharecroppers, and mixed cropping/laborers in the United States; and 3 million Blacks. In Tennessee, sharecroppers operated approximately one-third of all farm units in the state in the 1930s, with white people making up two thirds or more of the sharecroppers. In Mississippi, by 1900, 36% of all white farmers were tenants or sharecroppers, while 85% of black farmers were. In Georgia, fewer than 16,000 farms were operated by black owners in 1910, while, at the same time, African-Americans managed 106,738 farms as tenants.

Around this time, sharecroppers began to form unions protesting against poor treatment, beginning in Tallapoosa County, Alabama in 1931, and Arkansas in 1934. Membership in the Southern Tenant Farmers Union included both blacks and poor whites, who used meetings, protests, and labor strikes to push for better treatment. The success of these actions frightened and enraged landlords, who responded with aggressive tactics. Landless farmers who fought the sharecropping system were socially denounced, harassed by legal and illegal means, and physically attacked by officials, landlords' agents, or in extreme cases, angry mobs. Sharecroppers' strikes in Arkansas and the Missouri Bootheel, the 1939 Missouri Sharecroppers' Strike, were documented in the newsreel Oh Freedom After While. The plight of a sharecropper was addressed in the song Sharecropper's Blues recorded by Charlie Barnet and His Orchestra in 1944.The sharecropping system in the U.S. increased during the Great Depression with the creation of tenant farmers following the failure of many small farms throughout the Dustbowl. Traditional sharecropping declined after mechanization of farm work became economical beginning in the late 1930s and early 1940s. As a result, many sharecroppers were forced off the farms, and migrated to cities to work in factories, or became migrant workers in the Western United States during World War II. By the end of the 1960s, sharecropping had disappeared in the United States.

Sharecropping and socioeconomic status 
About two-thirds of sharecroppers were white, the rest black. Sharecroppers, the poorest of the poor, organized for better conditions. The racially integrated Southern Tenant Farmers Union made gains for sharecroppers in the 1930s. Sharecropping had diminished in the 1940s due to the Great Depression, farm mechanization, and other factors.

Economic theories of share tenancy
The theory of share tenancy was long dominated by Alfred Marshall's famous footnote in Book VI, Chapter X.14 of Principles where he illustrated the inefficiency of agricultural share-contracting. Steven N.S. Cheung (1969),  challenged this view, showing that with sufficient competition and in the absence of transaction costs, share tenancy will be equivalent to competitive labor markets and therefore efficient.

He also showed that in the presence of transaction costs, share-contracting may be preferred to either wage contracts or rent contracts—due to the mitigation of labor shirking and the provision of risk sharing. Joseph Stiglitz (1974, 1988),  suggested that if share tenancy is only a labor contract, then it is only pairwise-efficient and that land-to-the-tiller reform would improve social efficiency by removing the necessity for labor contracts in the first place.

Reid (1973), Murrel (1983), Roumasset (1995)  and Allen and Lueck (2004) provided transaction cost theories of share-contracting, wherein tenancy is more of a partnership than a labor contract and both landlord and tenant provide multiple inputs. It has also been argued that the sharecropping institution can be explained by factors such as informational asymmetry (Hallagan, 1978; Allen, 1982; Muthoo, 1998), moral hazard (Reid, 1976; Eswaran and Kotwal, 1985; Ghatak and Pandey, 2000), 
intertemporal discounting (Roy and Serfes, 2001), price fluctuations (Sen, 2011) or limited liability (Shetty, 1988; Basu, 1992; Sengupta, 1997; Ray and Singh, 2001).

See also

Coolie
Convict lease
Peonage
Rent-seeking
Rural tenancy
Sharefarming
Sharemilking
Tenant farmer
Wage slavery

References

Further reading

External links

 King Cotton's Slaves, 1936 newsreel by The March of Time about landless Southern farmers

Crops
Agricultural labor
Agricultural labor in the United States
Landowners
Real property law
Land tenure